James Pierce (1900–1983) was an American actor.

James Pierce may also refer to:

James Pieronnet Pierce (1825–1897), American pioneer entrepreneur in California
James F. Pierce (1830–1905), American state senator from New York
James Pierce (curler) (born 1963), American wheelchair Paralympian
Jimmy Pierce, Marvel Comics Punisher superhero, first appearance 1993

See also
James Pierce Jr. House, American historic home built in 1833
Todd James Pierce (born 1965), American novelist and short story writer
James Peirce (c. 1674–1726), English dissenting minister
James Pearce (disambiguation)